Vickery v Waitaki International Ltd [1992] 2 NZLR 58 is a cited case in New Zealand regarding terms implied by the Courts to give "business efficacy" to a contract that would have otherwise been unworkable.

References

Court of Appeal of New Zealand cases
New Zealand contract case law
1992 in case law
1992 in New Zealand law